The Poor Old Lady by Lorenzo Jaramillo on the 1901 edition of the book Moral Tales for Formal Children by Rafael Pombo. The Poor Old Lady by Lorenzo Jaramillo, 1901.
The Poor Old Lady is a fairy tale, best known in Latin America. It was first published in the book Moral Tales for Formal Children in 1854 by the Colombian poet Rafael Pombo. Due to the importance and impact of this play in Latin American children Latin American literature of the nineteenth century, "The Poor Old Lady" became one of the most memorable characters in the Colombian and Latin American childhood. This paradoxical but amusing story is still reprinted in compilations of children stories and nursery rhymes.

Plot of the story
"The Poor Old Lady" tells the story of a rich old lady who has everything (clothes, goods, food.). However, in each verse of the story she is described as someone who complains about having nothing. At the end, the poor old lady dies from all the alleged complications which she had. In an ironic way the story ends with a particular phrase: “God grant that we can enjoy the poverty of that poor lady and die from the same ill.”

Characters
The story revolves around a unique character, the poor old lady, which is based on a commonly known social stereotype.

Commentary
Like all tales and rhymes of Rafael Pombo, "The Poor Old Lady" teaches children about everyday aspects of human beings and society. Women and their insatiable desire to have many shoes and dresses, and in a deeper layer this story deals with a main aspect: the human greed and exposes that material things are not the most important stuff in life.

The poor old lady explores 2 very basic human ensigns:

 ungratefulness and undermining of what she had 
 the constant see of what she lacks of.

Negative or positive ensigns?
For many she was just a greedy lady that never noticed what she had was more than what many others had.
But we could imagine also that an old lady like her probably would have tried along her life all kind of drinks, and meals and shoes and beds and seats, which would have made of her a truly curious and exploratory person, perhaps insatiable.

Verses

Modern uses and adaptations
The poor old lady is one of the most recognized characters of the Colombian culture, and is commonly used in elementary school textbooks, nursery rhymes, and child literature compilations.

In 1977, Fernando Laverde performed the animated film version of this story, which is considered the first animated film created in Colombia.

Representations of the character are used in parades and carnivals. In recent years, the theme parks Mundo Aventura and Colombian National Coffee Park have used animatronics versions of "The Poor Old Lady".

References

Fairy tales
Colombian culture
Female characters in fairy tales